In mathematics, permutation representation may refer to:
 A group action, see also Permutation representation
 A representation of a symmetric group (see Representation theory of the symmetric group)